Air Pohang was a South Korean domestic low-cost airline that launched operations in February 2018. As indicated by its name, the company focused on serving residents of Pohang, a city on the southeastern coast of the peninsula, as well as the rest of North Gyeongsang Province. As of February 2018, the airline flew to two destinations from its base at Pohang Airport using three CRJ-200 aircraft. The airline ceased all operations on 29 November 2018.

History
Air Pohang was founded by the company Dong-Hwa Electronics, which made an initial investment of 10 billion won. The airline commenced operations on 7 February 2018, with a flight from Gimpo Airport in Seoul to Pohang Airport. It thus became the seventh low-cost carrier based in South Korea.

Destinations
The following destinations were served:

Fleet
Before ceased operations, the company operated two CRJ-200 aircraft that each seat 50 passengers.

See also
List of defunct airlines of South Korea

References

External links

2018 disestablishments in South Korea
Airlines established in 2018
Airlines disestablished in 2018
Defunct airlines of South Korea
South Korean companies established in 2018